Maytenus stipitata is a species of plant in the family Celastraceae. It is a tree endemic to the Mexican state of Chiapas.

References

stipitata
Endemic flora of Mexico
Trees of Chiapas
Vulnerable plants
Taxonomy articles created by Polbot
Taxobox binomials not recognized by IUCN